The 1950 Tampa Spartans football team represented the University of Tampa in the 1950 college football season. It was the Spartans' 14th season. The team was led by head coach Frank Sinkwich, in his first year, and played their home games at Phillips Field in Tampa, Florida. They finished with a record of five wins and four losses (5–4).

On March 1, 1950, Frank Sinkwich was hired by Tampa to serve as the Spartans' head coach after the resignation of Mike Gaddis. The season opened with a victory at Camp Lejeune and a loss against Jacksonville State before the Spartans won their first home game of the season against . Tampa then won their next game over  before they lost their second game of the season to Appalachian State. The first came against Marine Corps Base Quantico and the second against Florida State.

Schedule

References

Tampa
Tampa Spartans football seasons
Tampa Spartans football